An election to the Assembly of London took place on 1 May 2008, along with the 2008 London mayoral election. The Conservatives gained 2 seats, Labour  gained one seat, the Liberal Democrats lost two seats, and UKIP were wiped out. Notably, a candidate for the British National Party (BNP) was elected for the first time.

The Assembly is elected by the Additional Member System. Fourteen directly elected constituencies exist, all of which have, to date, only ever been won by the Conservative Party or the Labour Party. An additional eleven members are allocated by a London wide top-up vote with the proviso that parties must win at least five percent of the vote to qualify for the list seats. Prior to these elections, these seats were held by five Liberal Democrats, two Labour Party members, two Green Party members and two One Londoners.

The two One London members were elected as candidates for the UK Independence Party, but then joined or supported the breakaway Veritas party and subsequently left Veritas to form One London. Compared to the previous election, two separate factions of RESPECT Unity Coalition stood in 2008: Respect (George Galloway), who supported Ken Livingstone in the mayoral election, and Left List, who supported Lindsey German (RESPECT's mayoral candidate in 2004).

Results

|-
!rowspan=3 colspan=2 | Parties
!colspan=10 | Additional member system
!rowspan=2 colspan=5 | Total seats
|-
!colspan=5 |Constituency
!colspan=5 |Region
|-
! Votes !! % !! +/− !! Seats !! +/− 
! Votes !! % !! +/− !! Seats !! +/−
! Total !! +/− !! %
|-

|-
! style="background-color: #813887|
| style="text-align:left;" |Christian Choice†
| style="text-align:right;" | 65,357
| style="text-align:right;" | 2.7
| style="text-align:right;" | 0.3
| style="text-align:right;" | 0
| style="text-align:right;" | 
| style="text-align:right;" | 70,294
| style="text-align:right;" | 2.9
| style="text-align:right;" | ±0.0
| style="text-align:right;" | 0
| style="text-align:right;" | 
| style="text-align:right;" | 0
| style="text-align:right;" | 
| style="text-align:right;" | -
|-

|-
|   || Total || 2,406,289 ||  ||  || 14 ||   || 2,389,891 ||  ||   || 11 ||  || 25 ||   ||
|}

† Joint-ticket Christian Party/Christian Peoples Alliance candidates standing as "Christian Choice"
# Communist Party of Britain were listed on the ballot paper as "Unity for Peace and Socialism"

 Total: 2,389,891
 Overall turnout: 45.28%

Analysis

Labour gained Brent and Harrow from Conservative (which had been the only constituency seat changing hands in 2004, having then been gained from Labour). The other 13 constituencies remained unchanged, with the two Liberal Democrat challenges, in South West against the Conservatives, and Lambeth and Southwark against Labour, both showing swings against the Liberal Democrats. The Labour-Conservative marginal, with just 1.3% majority, of Enfield and Haringey was defended by Labour with only a tiny swing to the Conservatives. Thus the Labour campaign for the London Assembly was considerably more successful than their campaign in the local elections held on the same day.

The Liberal Democrat and UKIP vote shares were both very poor compared with 2004, with UKIP wiped out entirely, and the Liberal Democrats losing two members.

The Labour vote share was up, but because of their capture of a FPTP seat, they did not gain any extra Additional Members against 2004. The biggest vote increase was for the Conservatives, achieving the highest ever showing of any party on the list, 34%; as a result and also due to their loss of one FPTP seat, they went from zero to three additional members. The Conservative record was subsequently surpassed by Labour in 2012 (41.1%) and 2016 (40.3%).

The British National Party won their first seat on the Assembly by reaching the 5% threshold.

London-wide list candidates

London Assembly representation

[†] Both UKIP Assembly members had subsequently defected and formed the new One London party.

New members

 Gareth Bacon (Conservative Party, London list)
 Richard Barnbrook (British National Party (subsequently expelled from party), London list)
 Andrew Boff (Conservative Party, London list)
 Victoria Borwick (Conservative Party, London list)
 James Cleverly (Conservative Party, Bexley and Bromley)
 Kit Malthouse (Conservative Party, West Central)
 Steve O'Connell (Conservative Party, Croydon and Sutton)
 Caroline Pidgeon (Liberal Democrats, London list)
 Navin Shah (Labour Party, Brent and Harrow)
 Richard Tracey (Conservative Party, Merton and Wandsworth)

Defeated members

 Bob Blackman (Conservative Party, Brent and Harrow)
 Damian Hockney (One London, London list)
 Peter Hulme-Cross (One London, London list)
 Geoff Pope (Liberal Democrats, London list)

Retiring members

 Angie Bray (Conservative Party, West Central)
 Sally Hamwee (Liberal Democrats, London list)
 Elizabeth Howlett (Conservative Party, Merton and Wandsworth)
 Bob Neill (Conservative Party, Bexley and Bromley)
 Andrew Pelling (Conservative Party, Croydon and Sutton)
 Graham Tope (Liberal Democrats, London list)

References

See also
2008 London mayoral election
2008 United Kingdom local elections
Greater London Authority
Mayor of London
London Assembly

2008 elections in the United Kingdom
Assembly election
2008
May 2008 events in the United Kingdom